McNeilus Truck and Manufacturing manufactures concrete transport trucks, and refuse collection vehicles in Dodge Center, Minnesota, where it is the largest employer.

The firm was created by Garwin and his brother Dennis McNeilus on July 21, 1970, and later sold to Oshkosh Corporation, in 1997. In addition to manufacturing and new vehicle sales and leasing, McNeilus also sells parts and used vehicles, and provides parts and service for past products.

Products
Concrete Mixer Products
Standard Mixer
Bridgemaster
Oshkosh S-Series
Revolution SMS Sliding Mixer
S-Series Revolution

Garbage Trucks
Front Loaders
Atlantic
Contender
Meridian
Side Loaders
ZR Side Loader
AutoReach Automated
 M/A Manual/ Automated Side Loader
Rear Loaders
Standard
Tag Axle
Heavy Duty
XC Extra Compaction
Metro-PAK
McNeilus M5
M2

References

External links
McNeilus Company Website
McNeilus Concrete Products Website
McNeilus Refuse (Waste) Collection Products Website

Truck manufacturers of the United States
Companies based in Minnesota
Oshkosh Corporation